Technology Experiment Satellite (TES) is an Indian remote sensing and photo-reconnaissance satellite.

Launch
TES was launched by the PSLV-C3 rocket from the Sriharikota High Altitude Range (SHAR) at Sriharikota in the south-east Indian coast at 04:53 UT on 22 October 2001. This is the fifth consecutive successful launch of the 294-tonne Polar Satellite Launch Vehicle (PSLV) rocket and the second launch with multiple satellites. The 1108 kg satellite carries a one-meter resolution panchromatic camera is an experimental satellite to demonstrate and validate, in orbit, technologies that could be used in the future satellites of Indian Space Research Organisation (ISRO). It was successfully placed in 572 km Sun-synchronous orbit on 22 October 2001 using the PSLV-C3. The PSLV-C3 also injected two more satellites: PROBA, a Belgian satellite and BIRD, a German satellite.

Mission
The technologies demonstrated in TES are attitude and orbit control system, high torque reaction wheels, new reaction control system with optimised thrusters and a single propellant tank, light weight spacecraft structure, solid state recorder, X-band phased array antenna, improved satellite positioning system, miniaturised TTC and power system and, two-mirror-on-axis camera optics.

TES has a pan chromatic camera for remote sensing. The camera is which is capable of producing images of one metre resolution. One metre resolution means the camera is able to distinguish between two objects which are separated at least a metre.

The launch of TES made India the second country in the world after the United States that can commercially offer images with one metre resolution. It is used for remote sensing of civilian areas, mapping industry and geographical information services. TES, helped the US Army with high-resolution images during the 11 September 2001 counter-terrorism offensive against the Taliban.

See also

 Indian military satellites
 Polar Satellite Launch Vehicle
 List of Indian satellites

References

External links
 ISRO PSLV C3 page 

Earth observation satellites of India
Spacecraft launched by PSLV rockets
Spacecraft launched in 2001
2001 in India